Enrique Torroella Sánchez (born 18 July 1969) is a Mexican taekwondo practitioner. He competed in the men's finweight at the 1988 Summer Olympics.

Notes

References

External links
 

1969 births
Living people
Sportspeople from Monterrey
Mexican male taekwondo practitioners
Olympic taekwondo practitioners of Mexico
Taekwondo practitioners at the 1988 Summer Olympics
World Taekwondo Championships medalists
20th-century Mexican people